St. Joseph's Church is a parish of the Roman Catholic Church in the city of Tyumen, Russia, in the Diocese of Transfiguration at Novosibirsk. The parish church is located at 7 Lenin Street.

History
The church was built between 1903 and 1906 by parishioners from Poland, thanks in part to the financial means of the family of Polish mines magnate Alfons Koziell-Poklewski (1809-1890). The first Masses were held in 1904.

It was closed during the Soviet era and was used as a warehouse, student club, and gym. It returned to the parish community in the early 1990s and religious ceremonies resumed starting in 1993. The church celebrated its centenary in 2004.

See also
Catholic Church in Russia

References

Buildings and structures in Tyumen
Polish diaspora in Siberia
Roman Catholic churches completed in 1904
20th-century Roman Catholic church buildings in Russia
Objects of cultural heritage of Russia of regional significance
Cultural heritage monuments in Tyumen Oblast